El Berrueco is a municipality of the autonomous community of Madrid in central Spain. It is located in the north of the Community of Madrid.

References 

 
Municipalities in the Community of Madrid